Uzi Does It is the debut album from Get Busy Committee, which was released on October 27, 2009 through Tokyo Sex Whale Records. It consists of vocals and production by Ryu and Apathy of Demigodz, and Scoop DeVille.

Release model
The album was released in several different formats, including:
Half of the album for free, if fans e-mailed, Tweeted, or posted a link on Facebook to promote the album
Traditional CD
Traditional digital download, in MP3, FLAC, and Apple Lossless
Digitally, via being housed in a limited edition Uzi-shaped 2GB USB stick

For an additional charge, purchasers could also receive a limited edition Uzi Does It T-shirt, custom made by TrueLove&FalseIdols clothing. There was also an extremely limited edition version made available exclusively at Suru L.A., which is currently owned by Linkin Park turntablist Joe Hahn.

On February 13, 2010, GBC released an official music video for "I Don't Care About You" via their YouTube channel.

Track listing

Samples
 "My Little Razorblade" samples "Heartbeats (song)" by The Knife.

References

External links
 Official GBC Website
 Official GBC MySpace

2009 albums
Albums produced by Scoop DeVille